The following is a list of characters that first appeared in the New Zealand soap opera Shortland Street in 1994, by order of first appearance.

Marilyn Bluck

Marilyn Bluck (previously Harrison) was the overbearing sister in law to Jenny Harrison (Maggie Harper). Marilyn rushed to Jenny in early 1993 when her marriage dissolved. She soon got a job at reception but was hurt when she discovered her friends were backstabbing her for her eccentricity. She tried to steal Laurie (Chic Littlewood) from Marj (Elizabeth McRae) but soon departed after making amends with the hospital staff. She returned in 1995 and again worked at reception. However the traumatizing truck crash saw Marilyn pack her things and leave the clinic for good. Her nickname from her colleagues at the clinic was "Motormouth Marilyn"

Simon Hilton-Jones

Dr. Simon Hilton-Jones was the hippy doctor abruptly hired to replace murderer - Katherine Blake (Magaret Umbers). Simon proved unpopular with the staff though inspirational to the young Jonathon McKenna (Kieren Hutchison). CEO - Michael (Paul Gittins) eventually decided to let Simon go, but not before he shred a few words of wisdom to Jonathon, something that inspired him to become a doctor.

Greg Feeney

Greg Feeney was the drug addicted step brother of Carmen Roberts (Theresa Healey) and potential love interest for Kirsty Knight (Angela Dotchin). The character was portrayed by Tim Balme for numerous stints up until 1999.

Grace Kwan

Dr. Grace Kwan first appeared in early 1994 portrayed by Lynette Forday. She departed in 1997 before returning 16 years later in a recurring role.

Charlotte Olsen

Charlotte Olsen was the head girl of Ferndale high and nemesis of Rachel McKenna (Angela Bloomfield). She also clashed with Nick Harrison (Karl Burnett) and had him removed from his prefect position. Charlotte grew jealous when Rachel started to date her crush – Tim Cunningham (Richard Vette) and successfully broke the two up.

Ellen Crozier

Ellen Crozier was portrayed by Robyn Malcolm for nearly 6 years. She proved to be one of the show's most successful and well received characters.

Minnie Crozier

Minnie Crozier was the teenage daughter of Ellen (Robyn Malcolm), who often found herself in challenging and dangerous relationships. She was portrayed by Katrina Devine for 7 years before she was axed as part of a cast overhaul.

Johnny Marinovich

Dr. Johnny Marinovich was introduced as the often mentioned husband of new character, Ellen Crozier (Robyn Malcolm). Before Yiakmis was cast, another actor had won the role but had dropped out. Yiakmis signed on to an initial 3 weeks, before being extended to 3 months. His contract was then extended to a further 6 months before he ended up becoming a core cast member. Johnny arrived to Ferndale in early 1994 but his marriage broke up when Ellen discovered Johnny had fathered a daughter through an affair many years beforehand. Johnny was tempted to get back with Ellen but when she had an affair he started a relationship with Jenny (Maggie Harper), who fell pregnant. Johnny would struggle to cope with the news that his father Davor (Bill Johnson) was a Nazi war criminal after being discovered by Ruth Brasch, (Joanne Briant) and his father's brain damaged state after a failed attempt at suicide. Following Jenny's abortion, Johnny started an affair with Ellen but returned to Jenny when she developed cancer. When Jenny suggested marriage, Johnny left her. He had a brief affair with teenager Ramona Derby (Ashleigh Seagar) and another with widow Julia Thornton (Elizabeth Hawthorne). Johnny had an affair with Isobel Kearney (Jennifer Ward-Lealand) and she became pregnant shortly before Johnny began to date Tiffany Warner (Alison James). The two married in 1998 and Tiffany also fell pregnant however she fell from a building and died. The baby was saved and Johnny ended up leaving with his daughter.

Rebecca Frost

Rebecca Frost appeared as a regular character for 3 years. She arrived as the paramedic partner of Rangi Heremaia (Blair Strang) but ended up becoming Chris Warner's (Michael Galvin) nurse after his paralyzing car accident. It soon turned out Rebecca was out for revenge after Chris played around her sister. The two made up for their differences and began to date, much to the angst of Stuart Neilson (Martin Henderson) who loved Rebecca. Rebecca was hired at the hospital and left Chris for Manny Atutahi (Albert Belz). The relationship was short lived and Rebecca's heart valve started to fail, causing her to become a born again Christian. She briefly dated Erik van der Molen (Peter Daube) before finally getting heart surgery. Rebecca had a short term relationship with Kane Taiaroa (Joe Folau) before she began dating Rangi. In 1997 Rangi and Rebecca became engaged only for Rebecca to pass out and die moments later, with her death being blamed on a faulty heart valve she had received years beforehand.

Annie Flynn

Annie Flynn first appeared in May 1994. She was hired at the hospital and shocked Guy Warner (Craig Parker) as the two were previously an item before she left him for a woman. Annie became attracted to the recently returned Meredith (Stephanie Wilkin) and after initial hesitation on Meredith's behalf, the two became an item. They departed together for Dunedin in July.

Tim Cunningham

Tim Cunningham was the head boy of Ferndale high school. Rachel McKenna's (Angela Bloomfield) rival Charlotte (Nicola Cliff) had a crush on Tim and as a result Rachel started dating him to spite her. However Rachel fell in love with Tim and was devastated when he broke up with her when Minnie (Katrina Devine) revealed Rachel's plan. The two eventually reconciled but Rachel was shocked to learn Tim was the father of Ramona's (Ashleigh Seagar) baby and was refusing to offer support. The two broke up.

Ruth Brasch

Ruth Brasch was the daughter of Marj's (Elizabeth McRae) fiancé Laurie Brasch (Chic Littlewood). Ruth was shocked to meet her fathers lover and opposed to the twos marriage. However Marj eventually talked Ruth around to the union and she attended the ceremony. Ruth returned the following year and began to manage the local bar. She started to date Rangi Heremaia (Blair Strang) however the revelation that she had been molested by her uncle saw Ruth depart in July.

Ramona Derby

Ramona Derby appeared for 16 months between 1994 and 1996. Ramona attended the same school as Rachel McKenna (Angela Bloomfield) and was a shoo-in for dux of the school. However, when Ramona discovered she was pregnant, the school refused her the position. It was soon revealed that the father of Ramona's child was Rachel's boyfriend Tim Cunningham (Richard Vette). Nonetheless the two remained friends and in 1995 Ramona gave birth to her daughter Lucy. She began to date Nick Harrison (Karl Burnett) but disaster struck at Christmas time when Nick misplaced Lucy. Upon the baby's recovery, Ramona split from Nick and began to date older man – Johnny Marinovich (Stelios Yiakmis). The affair was short and Ramona ended up leaving Ferndale shortly into the new year.

Vic Roberts

Vic Roberts appeared in a single guest stint throughout November. He was Carmen Roberts' (Theresa Healey)'s sluggish father who was after the money she had won in the lottery. Guy Warner (Craig Parker) eventually paid Vic to leave Carmen's life and never return.

Manny Atutahi

Hamana "Manny" Atutahi first appeared in late 1994 as the nephew of established character, Hone Ropata (Temuera Morrison). Manny arrived to stay with Hone and despite attracting Rebecca Frost (Luisa Burgess), Manny fell in with the criminal underworld and after landing in hospital, Hone accidentally killed Manny's attacker with a punch. Manny dated Rebecca but left her for Rachel McKenna (Angela Bloomfield). When Rachel was harassed by her university lecturer, Manny viciously attacked him and was sent to prison for assault. Rachel left Manny for Rangi (Blair Strang), resulting in an increasingly violent Manny stabbing him when he came to visit. When Rachel learned of the attack, she disowned Manny forever.

Linda Corrine

Linda Corrine was portrayed by Shirley Duke in guest roles from 1994 to 1995, 2009 and 2010. She was the priest who was the celebrant at Kirsty Knight (Angela Dotchin) and Lionel Skeggins (John Leigh) wedding. When Stuart Neilson (Martin Henderson) interrupted the marriage, the wedding was cancelled but Priest Corrine married the two later that evening on their houseboat. Priest Corrine returned 14 years later when she married Morgan Braithwaite (Bonnie Soper) and Gerald Tippett (Harry McNaughton) during a supposed rehearsal. She returned a year later as the celebrant for Sophie McKay (Kimberley Crossman) and Kieran Mitchell's (Adam Rickitt) wedding which again was gatecrashed and cancelled. In 2012 Corrine acted as the minister for Luke Durville (Gerald Urquhart) and Bella Cooper's (Amelia Reid) wedding.

Wilbur Skeggins

Wilbur Skeggins made an uncredited guest appearance in the infamous 1994 cliffhanger where he attended his son, Lionel's (John Leigh) wedding to Kirsty Knight (Angela Dotchin). Wilbur visited his son in 1997 and later in the year, Lionel traveled to Wellington after hearing Wilbur had suffered a heart attack. Though it turned out that Wilbur had been faking illness in a bid to win back his "mail order" wife - Angelina (Geeling Ng). Upon discovering the news, Lionel and Kirsty returned to Ferndale however the small plane they were traveling in failed and the two were involved in a dramatic plane crash.

Notes
Linda Corrine was credited as "Priest Corrine" in her appearances in both 1994 and 1995, whilst being credited as "Celebrant" in 2009, 2010 and 2012. She was given the name "Linda" through dialogue in March 2010.

References

1994
, Shortland Street